Richard Harold Hanson (November 28, 1931 – January 2, 2023) was an American politician.

Hanson was born in Duluth, Minnesota, and graduated from Central High School in Duluth in 1949. He worked in the office machine business and with the railroad. Hanson served in the Minnesota National Guard from 1950 to 1957. Hanson served in the Minnesota House of Representatives in 1967 and 1968. Hanson died in Duluth on January 2, 2023, at the age of 91.

References

1931 births
2023 deaths
Members of the Minnesota House of Representatives
Minnesota National Guard personnel
Politicians from Duluth, Minnesota